Thomas Edward may refer to:

 Thomas Edward (naturalist) (1814–1886), Scottish naturalist
 Thomas Edward (MP), MP for Taunton

See also
Thomas Edwards (disambiguation)
 T. E. Lawrence (1888–1935), Thomas Edward Lawrence, British soldier, liaison officer during the Arab Revolt
 Thomas E. Watson (1856–1922), American politician from Georgia
 Thomas Edward Brown (1830–1897), Manx poet, scholar and theologian
 Thomas Edward Bridgett (1829–1899), English priest and historical writer